The  Kukatpally Metro Station is located on the Red Line of the Hyderabad Metro. This station was opened to public on 2017. It is near to Big Bazaar, BJP Office, Omni Hospital, Sri Chaitanya Junior College, TSRTC Bus Stop, Reliance Digital and Indian Post Office.

History
It was opened on  29 November 2017.

The station

Structure
Kukatpally elevated metro station situated on the Red Line of Hyderabad Metro.

Facilities
The stations have staircases, elevators and escalators from the street level to the platform level which provide easy and comfortable access. Also, operation panels inside the elevators are installed at a level that can be conveniently operated by all passengers, including differently-abled and elderly citizens.

Station layout
Street Level This is the first level where passengers may park their vehicles and view the local area map.

Concourse level Ticketing office or Ticket Vending Machines (TVMs) is located here. Retail outlets and other facilities like washrooms, ATMs, first aid, etc., will be available in this area.

Platform level  This layer consists of two platforms. Trains takes passengers from this level.

See also

References

External links

Hyderabad Metro Rail Ltd
 UrbanRail.Net – descriptions of all metro systems in the world, each with a schematic map showing all stations.

Hyderabad Metro stations
2017 establishments in Telangana
Railway stations in India opened in 2017